Sally Lowenthal (born February 25, 1935), better known as Sally Jessy Raphael, is an American former tabloid talk show host known for her program Sally (originally called The Sally Jessy Raphael Show).

Early life and education
Lowenthal was born in February 25, 1935 in Easton, Pennsylvania. She attended and graduated from Easton Area High School in Easton. She also spent time in San Juan, Puerto Rico, where her father, Jesse Lowenthal, was in the rum exporting business and her mother, Zelda Lowenthal (aka Dede Lowry), ran an art gallery. She has a younger brother, Steven Lowenthal.

She spent some of her teenage years in Scarsdale, New York, where one of her first media jobs was at the local AM radio station, WFAS. The station had a program by and for junior high school students and Raphael read the news. She attended Carnegie Mellon University in Pittsburgh, Pennsylvania, and the University of Puerto Rico in San Juan. Raphael studied acting under the tutelage of Sanford Meisner at New York City’s Neighborhood Playhouse School of the Theatre.

She took her mother's maiden name of Raphael as her professional name and plucked the theatrical surname of Jessy from her father's family.

Career

Journalism and broadcasting
Following her graduation from Columbia University, she became a news correspondent, covering Central America for the Associated Press and United Press International, thanks in large part to her ability to speak both English and Spanish fluently. She also obtained considerable experience in the media in Puerto Rico, where she worked in both radio and television. One of her first jobs was hosting a TV cooking show. While working in radio, she met the man who became her second husband, Karl Soderlund, who was the general manager of a radio station that hired her. After he was fired, the two left Puerto Rico to work in Miami. While Raphael was on the air as a radio announcer in Miami, she met and became friends with talk show host Larry King.

Raphael's broadcasting career was not an immediate success. She told numerous reporters over the years that she bounced around from station to station in both Puerto Rico and the United States, working as a disc jockey, news reporter, and the host of a show where she interviewed celebrities. She worked at 24 stations, and was fired from 18 of them. In the early 1980s, she was asked to do a call-in advice show on WMCA in New York City. In the late 1980s, she guest starred as herself in The Equalizer episode "Making of a Martyr".

Talk show
Raphael's husband Karl Soderlund assumed the role of her manager, and was a partner in her two biggest successes. She hosted a radio call-in advice show distributed by NBC Talknet which ran from 1981 to 1987, but is best known for hosting the television talk show, The Sally Jessy Raphael Show (later shortened to Sally), which ran in first-run syndication from October 17, 1983, to May 24, 2002.  "Talknet" was brand new when she came to the attention of producer Maurice Tunick. According to David Richards of The Washington Post, Tunick had auditioned a number of potential hosts, but hadn't yet found the right one. Tunick gave Raphael a one-hour trial run on NBC's Washington, D.C., affiliate, WRC, in August 1981. Before going on the air, she decided that rather than doing a political show, she would give advice and discuss subjects she knew a lot about, such as relationship problems. Soon, her advice show was being heard on over 200 radio stations, and she developed a loyal group of fans.

One of those fans turned out to be talk show host Phil Donahue, who happened to hear her show one night and liked how she related to the audience. His encouragement led to a tryout on television, where producer Burt Dubrow gave her a chance to be a guest host on his talk show.  She was not very polished, but people who had loved her radio show were very positive about her being on TV. Her non-threatening and common-sense manner appealed to Dubrow, who believed she would gain more confidence as she got some TV experience. By mid-October 1983, she was given her own show on KSDK-TV in St. Louis. The Sally Jessy Raphael Show was only a half-hour, but it was the beginning of her successful career as a talk show host.  
   
Raphael became known to television viewers for her oversized red-framed glasses, a trademark that began entirely by accident. The source of her famous red-framed glasses goes all the way back to her first broadcast news job. Raphael had difficulty reading the teleprompter and, with five minutes before air time, quickly went to a store across the street from the studio to purchase a pair of reading glasses. The only one she could find was a red pair. While her bosses disliked them, the audience seemed to think they looked good, so she kept wearing that style from then on.

By 2000, both Raphael and Jerry Springer were in decline. As one media critic observed, Springer's ratings were the lowest they had been in three years, but Raphael's ratings were now the lowest they had been in 12 years. Raphael was already having problems with her syndicator: she believed that USA Networks Inc. was more interested in doing promotion for Springer, whose show was more popular than hers, and Maury Povich, who had recently left Paramount Television to join USA's syndication arm, than they ever were for her own show. She celebrated her 3,500th episode in early 1998. By March 2002, it was announced that, after an 18-year run, her show was being canceled. In 2002, Raphael was named by Talkers Magazine to both their 25 Greatest Radio Talk Show Hosts of all time (she was #5), and the 25 Greatest Television Talk Show Hosts of all time (she was #11). She was one of only three personalities to make both the radio and the TV lists.

From approximately 2005 to 2008, she hosted a daily radio show, Sally Jessy Raphael on Talknet (previously called Sally JR's Open House), on the Internet and in syndication to local radio stations. The show's flagship station was WVIE, Baltimore, Maryland, and the show aired on AM stations in New England, the Mid-Atlantic and the Midwest, in addition to at least one station in Arizona. The show also aired on XM Satellite Radio's America's Talk channel from November 19, 2007, until its end. The name "Talknet" is a revival of the name of NBC Talknet, the now-defunct radio network that carried her previous radio show from 1981 to 1987. She abruptly ended the show July 7, 2008.

On November 10, 2010, Raphael, along with former talk show hosts Phil Donahue, Geraldo Rivera, Ricki Lake and Montel Williams, were invited as guests on The Oprah Winfrey Show.

Raphael offered to induct Rush Limbaugh into the Radio Hall of Fame when he was voted into the Hall in 1993. Surprised by the offer, Limbaugh accepted, only to see Raphael use her speech to speak out against the vote and excoriate Limbaugh. The following day, Paul Harvey used his radio program to defend Limbaugh, who was privately hurt by Raphael's betrayal. In an act of retribution, one of Limbaugh's staffers slipped a picture of Raphaël without her makeup or trademark glasses (taken from one of Raphael's staffers, as both hosts worked in the same studio at the time) onto Limbaugh's television program without his knowledge.

Personal life
Raphael was married for the first time in 1953, at age 18, to Andrew Vladimir; they divorced five years later. They had two daughters, Allison and Andrea, and two grandchildren, Max and Kyle. Allison died at the age of 33 on February 2, 1992; her death was ruled an accidental overdose because of "combined effects of several prescribed drugs"

She married Karl Soderlund in 1962. He later became her manager. They have one son, Jason. They were married for 58 years until Soderland's death in 2020.

References

External links

 
 
 

1935 births
Living people
American television talk show hosts
American women journalists
Carnegie Mellon University alumni
Columbia University alumni
Daytime Emmy Award for Outstanding Talk Show Host winners
Easton Area High School alumni
People from Dutchess County, New York
People from Easton, Pennsylvania
People from Scarsdale, New York